King Wen of Chu (died 677 BC) was from 689 to 677 BC king of the state of Chu during the Spring and Autumn period of ancient China.  He was born Xiong Zi and King Wen was his posthumous title.

King Wen succeeded his father King Wu of Chu, who died in 690 BC.

He died in 677 BC and was succeeded by his son Du'ao. He also had another son, King Cheng of Chu.

References

Monarchs of Chu (state)
7th-century BC Chinese monarchs
677 BC deaths
Year of birth unknown
Chinese kings